"Video Game" is a song written, recorded, and produced by American singer-songwriter Sufjan Stevens for his eighth studio album, The Ascension (2020). It was released as the album's second single on August 13, 2020, through Stevens' Asthmatic Kitty label. It has been called a synth-pop song with lyrics that describe the effects of social media upon society. A music video for the track was released alongside the single.

Track listings

Release history

References 

2020 singles
2020 songs
American synth-pop songs
Sufjan Stevens songs